Pectenocypris micromysticetus is a species of cyprinid fish. It is endemic to Sumatra (Indonesia). It is known only from the Batang Hari River basin. It is common in oxbow lakes and still pools in open or recently flooded areas.

Pectenocypris micromysticetus grows to  standard length.

References

Further reading
Murni, Mida Yulia, and Dewi Imelda Roesma. "Inventarisasi Jenis-Jenis Ikan Cyprinidae di Sungai Batang Nareh, Kabupaten Padang Pariaman." Jurnal Biologi Universitas Andalas 3.4 (2014).

Pectenocypris
Cyprinid fish of Asia
Freshwater fish of Sumatra
Endemic fauna of Sumatra
Fish described in 2009
Taxa named by Maurice Kottelat
Taxa named by Heok Hui Tan